General elections were held in Western Samoa on 22 February 1985. Voting was restricted to matai and citizens of European origin ("individual voters"), with the Matai electing 45 MPs and Europeans two. The result was a victory for the Human Rights Protection Party, which won 31 seats. Its leader, Tofilau Eti Alesana, remained Prime Minister.

Results
Fifteen of the 47 elected MPs were new to the Legislative Assembly.  Minister of Health Lavea Lio lost his seat.

Aftermath
Following the elections, the HRPP held a two-day conference on 25–26 February, the HRPP re-elected Tofilau Eti Alesana as its candidate for Prime Minister. On 7 March, Va'ai Kolone resigned from the party. On 9 March the Legislative Assembly elected Alesana Prime Minister; he was the only candidate after Kolone declined to be nominated. Nonumalo Sofara was re-elected as Speaker.

However, in December, 11 members of the HRRP defected to form a coalition government with the Christian Democratic Party, and Va'ai Kolone was elected Prime Minister.

See also
List of members of the Legislative Assembly of Western Samoa (1985–1988)

References

Western Samoa
General
Elections in Samoa
Election and referendum articles with incomplete results